Adil Annani, also known as Adil Ennani, (born 30 June 1980) is a male Moroccan long-distance runner. He has represented his country three times in the marathon at the World Championships in Athletics.

He competed in the marathon event at the 2015 World Championships in Athletics in Beijing, China, but did not finish.

On the professional running circuit, he has finished tenth at the 2014 Boston Marathon and fourth at the 2012 London Marathon, recording a personal best of 2:07:43 hours at the latter event. He was the 2009 winner of the Beppu-Ōita Marathon in Japan with a time of 2:10:15 hours.

He was banned from competition for four years for irregularities in his biological passport with the ban set to end on 20 June 2020. In addition, all his results from 4 November 2011 onwards were annulled.

International competitions

See also
 Morocco at the 2015 World Championships in Athletics

References

External links

Living people
Place of birth missing (living people)
1980 births
Moroccan male long-distance runners
Moroccan male marathon runners
World Athletics Championships athletes for Morocco
Doping cases in athletics
Moroccan sportspeople in doping cases
20th-century Moroccan people
21st-century Moroccan people